Ger Collins (born 13 July 1999) is an Irish hurler who plays as a goalkeeper for Cork Premier Championship club Ballinhassig and at inter-county level with the Cork senior hurling team.

Playing career

Ballinhassig

Collins joined the Ballinhassig club at a young age and played in all grades at juvenile and underage levels as a hurler and Gaelic footballer.

On 16 September 2018, Collins made his first appearance for Ballinhassig's top adult team when he lined out in goal for their 1-22 to 0-14 defeat by Valley Rovers in the Premier Intermediate Championship.

Cork

Minor

Collins first lined out for Cork as a member of the minor team during the 2016 Munster Championship. He made his first appearance in goal on 6 April in a 0-17 to 1-10 defeat of Waterford.

Collins was eligible for the minor grade again the following year. On 9 July, he was in goal when Cork defeated Clare by 4-21 to 0-16 to win the Munster Championship for the first time since 2008. On 3 September, Collins was again in goal when Cork suffered a 2-17 to 2-15 defeat by Galway in the All-Ireland final.

Under-21 and under-20

Collins subsequently joined the Cork under-21 team for the 2018 Munster Championship and took over as goalkeeper from his brother Patrick. On 4 July, he won a Munster Championship medal following Cork's 2-23 to 1-13 defeat of Tipperary in the final. On 26 August, Collins was in goal for Cork's 3-13 to 1-16 All-Ireland final defeat by Tipperary. He was later named as goalkeeper on the Team of the Year.

On 3 July 2019, Collins made his first appearance for Cork's inaugural under-20 team in the Munster Championship. He lined out in goal in the 1-20 to 0-16 defeat of Limerick. On 23 July 2019, Collins was again in goal when Cork suffered a 3-15 to 2-17 defeat by Tipperary in the Munster final. He was again selected in goal when Cork faced Tipperary for a second time in the All-Ireland final on 24 August 2019, however, he ended the game on the losing side after a 5-17 to 1-18 defeat.

Senior

Collins was a late addition to the Cork senior team during the 2018 All-Ireland Championship. On 29 July, he was an unused substitute when Cork suffered a 3-32 to 2-21 extra-time defeat by Limerick in the All-Ireland semi-final.

Career statistics

Club

Division

Inter-county

Honours

Cork
Munster Under-21 Hurling Championship (1): 2018 
Munster Minor Hurling Championship (1): 2017

References

External link
Ger Collins profile at the Cork GAA website

1999 births
Living people
Ballinhassig hurlers
CIT hurlers
Cork inter-county hurlers
Hurling goalkeepers